Hal  is a masculine given name, often a diminutive form (hypocorism) of Harold, Henry or Harvey, and a nickname. Notable people with the name include:

People 
 Hal Ashby (1929–1988), American film director
 Hal Barwood, American game designer
 Hal Bidlack (born 1958), former USAF officer
 Hal Blaine (Harold Simon Belsky; 1929–2019), American drummer
 Hal Colebatch, Australian politician
 Hal Colebatch (author) (1945–2019), Australian author
 Hal Daub (born 1941), American politician
 Hal David (1921–2012), American lyricist
 Hal Davis (1933–1998), American songwriter
 Hal Dixon (biochemist) (1928–2008), Irish biochemist
 Hal Duncan (born 1971), Scottish writer
 Hal Geer (1916–2017), American film producer
 Hal Gibney (1911–1973), American broadcast announcer
 Hal Gill (born 1975), American ice hockey player
 Hal Goldsmith (1930–2004), American fencer
 Hal Gurnee (born 1935), American TV director
 Hal Halvorsen, military officer
 Hal Helgeson (1931–2007), American geochemist
 Hal Holbrook (1925–2021), American actor
 Hal Hunter (disambiguation)
 Hal Ketchum (1953–2020), American singer
 Hal Linden (born 1931), American actor
 Hal Lindsey (born 1929), American evangelist
 Hal McRae (born 1945), American baseball player
 Hal Moore (1922–2017), U.S. Army general
 Hal Moore (wrestler) (1923–2003), American
 Hal Needham (1931–2013), American stunt performer
 Hal Newhouser (1921–1998), American baseball pitcher 
 Hal Porter (1911–1984), Australian novelist
 Hal Prewitt (born 1954), American racing driver
 Hal Prince (1928–2019), American theatrical producer
 Hal Roach (1892–1992), American film producer
 Hal Roach (comedian) (1927–2012), Irish
 Hal Robson-Kanu (born 1989), Welsh footballer
 Hal Rogers (born 1937), American politician
 Hal Singer (1919–2020), American musician
 Hal Smith (disambiguation)
 Hal Sparks (born 1969), American actor
 Hal Steinbrenner (born 1969), American businessman
 Hal Sutton (born 1958), American golfer
 Hal B. Wallis (1898–1986), American film producer
 Hal Williams (born 1934), American actor
 Hal Willis (ice hockey) (born 1946), Canadian
 Hal Willis (singer) (1933–2015), Canadian
 Hal Willis, pseudonym of English writer Charles Robert Forrester (1803–1850)
 Jean Ven Robert Hal (born 1970), Italian composer

Fictional characters 
 Prince Hal, later Henry V of England
 HAL 9000, a computer in Arthur C. Clarke's fiction
 Dr. Hal Emmerich (Otacon), Metal Gear video games
 Hal Hunt, in children's novels
 Hal Incandenza, in the novel Infinite Jest
 Hal Jordan (Green Lantern), in DC Comics
 Hal Willis, in the 87th Precinct series
 Hal Yorke, in UK TV series Being Human
 Hal (Malcolm in the Middle), in the TV series
 Hal (A Series of Unfortunate Events), in the film
 Hal the Dog, in Nature Cat
 Hal Stewart, in Megamind
 Hal Turner, in 24 (TV series)
 Hal, a green boomerang toucan bird in the Angry Birds franchise
 Hal, in the cartoon Dot.
 Hal, a cockroach in WALL-E
 Hal, a minor character in the novel series Warriors
 Hal, a character from the video game Minecraft Dungeons

English masculine given names
Hypocorisms
Lists of people by nickname